La madrastra (English: Stepmother) is a Mexican telenovela produced by Televisa for Telesistema Mexicano in 1962.

Cast 
 Gloria Marín		
 Eduardo Fajardo			
 Raúl Ramírez			
 Susana Alexander			
 Angelines Fernández			
 Josefina Escobedo			
 Prudencia Grifell			
 Marcela Daviland			
 Raúl Meraz			
 Luis Gimeno			
 Consuelo Monteagudo

References

External links 

Mexican telenovelas
1962 telenovelas
Televisa telenovelas
1962 Mexican television series debuts
1962 Mexican television series endings
Spanish-language telenovelas